Union Township, Missouri may refer to one of the following 33 places in the State of Missouri:

 Union Township, Barton County
 Union Township, Benton County
 Union Township, Bollinger County
 Union Township, Cass County
 Union Township, Clark County
 Union Township, Crawford County
 Union Township, Daviess County
 Union Township, Dunklin County
 Union Township, Franklin County
 Union Township, Harrison County
 Union Township, Holt County
 Union Township, Iron County
 Union Township, Jasper County
 Union Township, Laclede County
 Union Township, Lewis County
 Union Township, Lincoln County
 Union Township, Marion County
 Union Township, Monroe County
 Union Township, Nodaway County
 Union Township, Perry County
 Union Township, Polk County
 Union Township, Pulaski County
 Union Township, Putnam County
 Union Township, Randolph County
 Union Township, Ripley County
 Union Township, Ste. Genevieve County
 Union Township, Scotland County
 Union Township, Stone County
 Union Township, Sullivan County
 Union Township, Washington County
 Union Township, Worth County
 Union Township, Webster County
 Union Township, Wright County

See also
Union Township (disambiguation)

Missouri township disambiguation pages